Judy Gingell,  (born November 26, 1946) is an aboriginal Canadian politician, who served as the commissioner of Yukon from 1995 to 2000.

Born in Moose Lake in 1946, Gingell was the founding director of the Yukon Native Brotherhood in 1969. During the 1970s and 1980s, she served on the executive council of the Yukon Indian Women's Association and became a founding director of Northern Native Broadcasting in the Yukon. She was then elected president of the Yukon Indian Development Corporation in 1980. She was also chair of the Council for Yukon Indians from 1989 to May 1995.

She was appointed as the first aboriginal Commissioner on June 23, 1995, and retired in September 2000. She ran in the McIntyre-Takhini riding for the Yukon Liberal Party in the 2002 Yukon general election, but was not elected to the Yukon Legislative Assembly.

In 2009, she was made a Member of the Order of Canada "for her contributions, over the past four decades, to the promotion and advancement of Aboriginal rights and governance in Yukon". She was made a member of the Order of Yukon in 2019.

References

External links
 Judith Gingell (nee Smith) family tree

1948 births
Living people
Commissioners of Yukon
Members of the Order of Canada
Members of the Order of Yukon
Politicians from Whitehorse
First Nations women in politics
Women in Yukon politics
Indspire Awards